The Dash 8 Series is a line of diesel-electric freight locomotives built by GE Transportation Systems.  It replaced the Dash 7 Series in the mid-1980s, and was superseded by the Dash 9 Series for freight usage and the Genesis Series for passenger usage in the mid-1990s.

All models of the Dash 8 Series are powered by a 16- or 12-cylinder, turbocharged, GE 7FDL 4-stroke diesel engine.

Specifications 

The design of the Dash 8 Series is based upon that of the Dash 7 Series. The biggest changes introduced during the production of the Dash 8 Series were the first use of a microprocessor-equipped engine control unit in a diesel locomotive, and the adoption of a modular system in the construction of the vehicle body.

The Dash 8 locomotive bodies were assembled from several modules, creating a combination to fit the length of the chassis.  On models with a traditional narrow short hood, the part of the equipment room immediately behind the cab is taller than the top of the rounded cab roof, giving those models a distinctive appearance.  On all models, that part of the equipment room houses the cooling fans for the dynamic braking system.

Traction motors of Dash 8 locomotives were powered by direct current.

Construction history 
The Dash 8 prototype was completed in 1984.  Manufacture of the improved production units started in earnest in 1987.  Early versions of the Dash 8 were manufactured on the Dash 7 production line, but their general appearance was different.  The Dash 8-40C, introduced in 1987, featured improved reliability.

Nomenclature 
The naming of the Dash 8 Series, and that of its various models, corresponded initially with that of its predecessor, the Dash 7.  So, for example, "B32-8" designated a B-B configured  Dash 8 Series locomotive.

After product improvements were made to the line in 1987, the official designations for models in this series changed to "Dash 8...", as shown below. However, for simplicity many railroads decided to use designations which follow the pattern of the Dash 7 line. For example, the Dash 8-40C is usually rendered as "C40-8".

The "W" suffix used for some models indicates the then-optional wide-nose "North American" safety cab.

Four axle models

Common features 
Specifications common to all Dash 8 Series four axle models are as follows:

 AAR wheel arrangement: B-B 
 Prime mover: GE V-type 7FDL-16 V16 engine, 7FDL-12 V12 for B32 models

Dash 8-32B (B32-8) 

This model was manufactured between 1984 and 1989

49 examples of the model were built for North American railroads.

All but 4 of these units were ordered by Norfolk Southern.

The others were 3 units ordered by Burlington Northern Railroad, and a GE demonstrator unit.

 Prime mover: GE 12-cylinder V-type 7FDL-12 four stroke diesel engine
 Power output:

Dash 8-36B (B36-8) 

This model, a one-off, was the original Dash 8 prototype, built in 1983.

 Power output:

Dash 8-39B (B39-8) 

A total of 145 examples of this model were manufactured from 1984.  Its external appearance is almost the same as that of the later Dash 8-40B model, with the obvious exception of the trucks.

The first three Dash 8-39Bs were built for Atchison, Topeka and Santa Fe Railway (ATSF).  A fourth example of the model, a GE demonstrator designated as a Dash 8-39BE (or B39-8E), was converted from the original Dash 8 prototype.

There were also two much larger groups of this model: 102 Dash 8-39BEs were fabricated for Locomotive Management Services (LMSX) and placed on long term lease to Burlington Northern Railroad.

The remaining 40 were built for the Southern Pacific Railroad.

 Power output:

Dash 8-40B (B40-8) 

In 1988 and 1989, a total of 150 units of this model were produced.

Substantial orders for the model came from ATSF (40 units), Conrail (30 units), New York, Susquehanna and Western Railway (24 units), and the model's biggest customer, St. Louis Southwestern Railway (54 units).

There were also small orders from Providence and Worcester Railroad (4 units), the United States Department of Energy (Savannah River Site), and a GE demonstrator unit.

 Power output:

Dash 8-40BW (B40-8W) 

Eighty three examples of this model were built for ATSF in the early 1990s.  ATSF was the only railroad to order it.  There was also one GE prototype and testbed, rebuilt from the prototype B39-8E.

The "W" suffix to this model's name indicates that it differs from the B40-8 in having a "wide nose" safety cab.

GE was almost commissioned by ATSF to make a B unit (cabless booster unit) version of this model, but because the price would have been the same for B40-8Ws with cabs or without, ATSF decided to order units with cabs only.

All of ATSF's B40-8Ws became part of BNSF, and many were later reliveried into one of BNSF's liveries.

Some have since been sold to other operators.

 Power output:  7FDL-16 turbocharged diesel engine

Dash 8-32BWH (B32-8WH) 
 

A total of 20 units of this type were built, with the last units being delivered in December 1991. All were built specifically for Amtrak and numbered 500 through 519. They were nicknamed "Pepsi Cans" and "Hockey Sticks" by many railfans, due to being originally painted in a wide-striped red, white, and blue livery. Since the most recent overhaul, however, the locomotives now have the current Phase V blue-silver livery with the current "wave" logo.

They were also the first locomotives that Amtrak purchased to replace the EMD F40PH before the introduction of the GE Genesis series locomotives in 1993. Although the units have since been relegated to yard service, maintenance of way service and transfer service, they are occasionally used on passenger trains.

Two of the units, Amtrak numbers #501 and #502, were sold to the California Department of Transportation. (CDTX) In 1994. The locomotives were renumbered #2051 and #2052, and received the Amtrak California paint scheme. They are currently being used on the State-Supported San Joaquin and Capital Corridor trains.

 Power output: 3,200 hp (2.4 MW)

Six axle models

Common features 
Specifications common to all Dash 8 Series six axle models, except where stated, are as follows:

 AAR wheel arrangement: C-C 
 Prime mover: GE V-type 7FDL-16 V16 engine, 7FDL-12 V12 for C32 models
 Maximum speed:

Dash 8-32C (C32-8) 

This was one of the earliest models in the Dash 8 Series.  Only 10 of the model were built, in 1984.  All of them were delivered to Conrail.

Initially, these units were painted in Conrail's standard blue livery. In 1997, Conrail assigned all 10 of them to "Ballast Express" service, and they were repainted into a gray version of the Quality scheme.

One C32-8 was eventually bought by Brasil Ferrovias (BF), after being retired by Conrail. However, this unit developed problems with its electronics, and was therefore decommissioned to supply parts for the mechanically similar C30-7As operated on the Cutralle–Quintela railroad.

 Prime mover: GE 12-cylinder V-type 7FDL-12 four stroke diesel engine
 Power output:

Dash 8-39C (C39-8) 

Between 1984 and 1987, a total of 161 examples of this model were produced for two North American railroads: Norfolk Southern and Conrail.

An initial batch of 114 of the standard version of this model was built for Norfolk Southern, which then ordered a batch of 25 examples of the C39-8E (Enhanced) model, with a carbody similar to that of the C40-8.

Conrail ordered 22 of the standard version.  After the Conrail split in 1999, 13 units of this order went to Norfolk Southern and the remaining 9 units went to CSX.

 Power output:

Dash 8-40C (C40-8) 

This was the first model of any locomotive series to be fitted with microprocessor-equipped engine control units.  A total of 581 examples of the model were manufactured between 1987 and 1992.

The C40-8 has a traditional narrow short hood, but otherwise its external appearance is almost the same as that of the later Dash 8-40CW model.

The most important customer for this model was UP, which ordered 257 of them.

Other large orders for the model came from Chicago and North Western Transportation Company (77 units), Conrail (25), CSX (147) and Norfolk Southern (75).

The remaining four units were supplied to Estrada de Ferro Carajás of Brazil.

 Power output:

Dash 8-40CM (C40-8M) 

Mechanically identical to the Dash 8-40C (see above) and Dash 8-40CW (see below), this model was constructed between 1990 and 1994 only for Canadian railways, with a production total of 84 units.

The model is distinguished from the Dash 8-40CW by the addition of a full-width cowl body and the use of a Canada-specific nose and windshield configuration.

BC Rail ordered 26 examples of the model, Canadian National ordered 55, and Quebec North Shore and Labrador Railway acquired the remaining three.

 Power output:

Dash 8-40CW (C40-8W) 

Early versions of this model differ from the Dash 8-40C only in having a "wide" or "safety" cab.  A total of 756 examples of the model were built, with the first being delivered to Union Pacific in 1990.

The C40-8W was continuously upgraded over the course of its production. Later model Conrail units were built with split cooling systems for the turbocharger intercooler and engine cooling (previous Dash 8 series had both on the same cooling system).

The units delivered to Conrail in 1993 and 1994 were equipped with GE's Integrated Function Displays (IFD).

Some of the C40-8Ws operated by Conrail were lease units owned by LMSX.  The other railroads that operated C40-8Ws as original owners were ATSF, CSX, and Union Pacific.

 Power output:

Dash 8-41CW (C41-8W) 

A total of 154 C41-8Ws were produced between 1993 and 1994 for both UP and ATSF.

Some Dash 8-40CW units were similarly uprated to Dash 8-41CW standard by the railroads.

 Power output:

Dash 8-44CW (C44-8W) 

A total of 53 examples of this model were built in 1993–1994, all of them for CSX numbered 9000-9052. This was the preproduction version of the Dash 9 series containing its innards but having an extended Dash 8 carbody (with the exception of the first three locomotives). They were all derated to 4000 hp.

 Power output: , later

See also

GE Dash 8-32BWH – a passenger locomotive model based on the Dash 8 Series
List of GE locomotives
Dash 8.5-40CW

References

Notes

Bibliography

External links 
 GE Transportation Systems. Earlier Locomotive Models – includes the Dash 8 Series
 NorthEast Rails: GE Dash 8 32-39 Diesel Railroad Locomotives; GE Dash 8 40-41 Diesel Railroad Locomotives

This article is based upon a translation of the Japanese-language version as at August 2012.

Dash 8 Series
B-B locomotives
C-C locomotives
Diesel-electric locomotives of the United States
Railway locomotives introduced in 1983